The 2015 Louisiana lieutenant gubernatorial election took place on October 24, 2015, to elect the Lieutenant Governor of Louisiana, with a runoff election held on November 21, 2015. Incumbent Republican Lieutenant Governor Jay Dardenne did not run for re-election to a second full term in office. He instead ran for Governor. Billy Nungesser won the election defeating Kip Holden, despite a Democratic victory in the gubernatorial election, in which John Bel Edwards defeated David Vitter by a similar margin.

Under Louisiana's jungle primary system, all candidates appeared on the same ballot, regardless of party and voters may vote for any candidate, regardless of their party affiliation. Since no candidate received a majority of the vote during the primary election, a runoff election was held on November 21, 2015 between Holden and Nungesser. Louisiana is the only state that has a jungle primary system (California and Washington have a similar "top two primary" system).

Candidates

Republican Party

Filed
 Elbert Guillory, state senator
 Billy Nungesser, President of Plaquemines Parish and candidate for lieutenant governor in 2011
 John Young, President of Jefferson Parish

Declined
 Scott Angelle, Louisiana Public Service Commissioner and former Lieutenant Governor (ran for Governor)
 Jay Dardenne, incumbent Lieutenant Governor (ran for Governor)
 Mike Edmonson, Superintendent of the Louisiana State Police

Democratic Party

Filed
 Kip Holden, Mayor-President of East Baton Rouge Parish

Did not run
 Rick Gallot, state senator

Jungle primary

Polling

Results

Runoff

Results

See also
United States gubernatorial elections, 2015
Lieutenant Governor of Louisiana

References

External links
Elbert Guillory for Lieutenant Governor
Kip Holden for Lieutenant Governor
Billy Nungesser for Lieutenant Governor
John Young for Lieutenant Governor

2015 United States lieutenant gubernatorial elections
Lieutenant Governor
2015
November 2015 events in the United States